Tafalisca is a genus of silent bush crickets in the family Gryllidae. Records for described species in Tafalisca are mostly from Central and South America.

Species
These 24 species belong to the genus Tafalisca:

 Tafalisca bahama Otte & Perez-Gelabert, 2009
 Tafalisca bahiensis (Saussure, 1878)
 Tafalisca bogotensis (Saussure, 1878)
 Tafalisca brasiliana (Saussure, 1878)
 Tafalisca claudicans (Brunner von Wattenwyl, 1893)
 Tafalisca crypsiphonus (Saussure, 1878)
 Tafalisca ecuador Gorochov, 2011
 Tafalisca eleuthera Otte & Perez-Gelabert, 2009
 Tafalisca evimon Otte & Perez-Gelabert, 2009
 Tafalisca furfurosa Otte, 2006
 Tafalisca gnophos Otte & Perez-Gelabert, 2009
 Tafalisca heros (Brunner von Wattenwyl, 1893)
 Tafalisca huanchaca Gorochov, 2017
 Tafalisca lineatipes Bruner, 1916
 Tafalisca lurida F. Walker, 1869 (silent bush cricket)
 Tafalisca maroniensis Chopard, 1930
 Tafalisca mexico Gorochov, 2011
 Tafalisca muta (Saussure, 1878)
 Tafalisca pallidocincta (Kirby, 1890)
 Tafalisca periplanes Otte & Perez-Gelabert, 2009
 Tafalisca porteri Chopard, 1930
 Tafalisca proxima Gorochov, 2011
 Tafalisca rico Otte & Perez-Gelabert, 2009
 Tafalisca virescens (Saussure, 1878)

References

Further reading

External links

Hapithinae
Articles created by Qbugbot